Rasikan (English: Admirer) is a 2004 Malayalam film directed by Lal Jose and written by Murali Gopy starring Dileep in the lead role with Murali Gopy, Biju Menon, Samvrutha Sunil, Sishwa, Siddharth, Sukumari, Kalabhavan Abi, Aniyappan and Jagathy Sreekumar in the supporting roles. This was Samvrutha Sunil and Murali Gopy's debut film. The movie was an average hit.

Synopsis
Sivankutty is a big fan of Super star Mohanlal aka Lalettan. A part-time mechanic, Sivankutty ekes out a living selling movie tickets in the black. It is at this stage that comely Karishma walks into his life. Karishma is an engineering student who happens to be staying in a hostel near Sivankutty's house. In no time, Sivankutty is bowled over by Karishma's curls and charms. But Sivankutty's cousin Thanki is in love with him, of which Sivankutty is unaware.

A local dada, Kaala Bhaskaran, has killed a policeman and is in jail. Beside herself with grief, the policeman's mother goes mad. Since Bhaskaran was a terror in the village, no one is ready to testify against him. But the plight of the old woman moves Sivankutty, who musters courage to give evidence against the goon. A pep talk by the local inspector Kapil Dev also gives Sivankutty the courage to take on Kaala Bhaskaran. The daring deed makes him a hero in the village.

Soon Sivankutty learns to his horror that Bhaskaran is out on parole. The 'hero' develops cold feet. What follows is the climax featuring a burly Bhaskaran and scared-out-of-his-wits Sivankutty.

Cast

Dileep as B. Shivankutty
Samvrutha Sunil as  Parvathy / Thanki
Murali Gopy as Theliparambil Kaala Bhaskaran
Biju Menon as SI Kapil Dev
Siddharth as Sudhi
Sukumari as Bhargaviyamma
Abi as Abu
Aniyappan as Jango
Jagathy Sreekumar as Thomas Chacko / Thomachan
Dinesh Prabhakar as Mohan Kodumpara
Mala Aravindan as Thanki's Father
Neena Kurup as Shailaja Sivankutty's Sister
Sishwa as Karishma Menon
 Harimurali as Unnikkuttan
Manikandan Pattambi as Nana Vasudevan
Suraj Venjaramoodu 
Hakim Rawther as Maari
Ambika Mohan as Madhavi
Nishanth Sagar as Arjun
Kalabhavan Shajon as Constable Ramabhadran
Narayanankutty as Annachi
Salim Kumar as Paramu Sivankutty's Brother-law (Guest Appearance)
Machan Varghese as PC Velu Annan
Madampu Kunjukuttan as Bharathan, Sivankutty's father
Vishnu Prasad
Priya Mohan

Soundtrack

Reception 
The film was an average grosser at box office. Later this received positive response from the audience after the release of its DVD.

References

External links
 

2000s Malayalam-language films
2004 action comedy films
2004 films
Films directed by Lal Jose
Indian action comedy films
Indian gangster films
Films shot in Thiruvananthapuram
Films with screenplays by Murali Gopy
Films scored by Vidyasagar
2004 comedy films